Premashilpi is a 1978 Indian Malayalam-language film. The film stars Jayabharathi, Jagathy Sreekumar, Hema Choudhary, Sankaradi and Sreelatha Namboothiri. The musical score is by V. Dakshinamoorthy. It is a remake of the 1968 Tamil film Teacheramma.

Cast 
Jayabharathi as Bharathi
Jagathy Sreekumar as Picasso Thankamani
Hema Choudhary as Hema
Aranmula Ponnamma as Prakash's mother
Sreelatha Namboothiri as Reetha
K. P. Ummer as Prakash
M. G. Soman as Soman
Meena as Reetha's mother
Mallika Sukumaran as Bindu's mother
Vanchiyoor Radha as Headmistress
Baby Priya as Bindu
Venu
Girija

Soundtrack 
The music was composed by V. Dakshinamoorthy with lyrics by Sreekumaran Thampi.

References

External links 
 

1978 films
1970s Malayalam-language films
Malayalam remakes of Tamil films